Cornutia is a genus of plants in the family Lamiaceae, first described in 1753. It is native to tropical parts of the Western Hemisphere: southern Mexico, Central America, West Indies, northern South America.

Species
Cornutia australis Moldenke - Ecuador, Brazil
Cornutia coerulea (Jacq.) Moldenke - Jamaica
Cornutia jamaicensis Moldenke - Jamaica
Cornutia obovata Urb. - Puerto Rico
Cornutia odorata (Poepp.) Schauer - Venezuela, Colombia, Ecuador, Peru
Cornutia pubescens C.F.Gaertn. - French Guiana
Cornutia pyramidata L. - southern Mexico (Veracruz, Tabasco, Oaxaca, Yucatán Peninsula, Chiapas), Central America, West Indies, Suriname, Venezuela, Colombia, Ecuador, Peru
Cornutia thyrsoidea Banks ex Moldenke - Jamaica

References

Lamiaceae
Lamiaceae genera
Taxa named by Carl Linnaeus